Unclean is the second studio album by the Denver, Colorado-based industrial metal band Rorschach Test. It was released  on April 7, 1998.

Track listing

References

1998 albums
Rorschach Test (band) albums